Kenneth Henderson Jack FRS (12 October 1918—28 January 2013) was a British chemist whose career involved the application of X-ray crystallography to the field of materials science.

Career and honours 
Jack was appointed to a Personal Chair in Applied Crystal Chemistry at the University of Newcastle upon Tyne in 1964, retiring in 1984 after 32 years service to the University.  His active retirement involved frequent travelling for conferences and consultancy work, including several trips to Japan that resulted in him receiving a rare Honorary Membership of the Ceramic Society of Japan, the only UK citizen to have received this honour.

Jack was elected Fellow of the Royal Society in 1980 and made an Officer of the Order of the British Empire in 1997.

Notes

1918 births
Fellows of the Royal Society
British chemists
X-ray crystallography
Officers of the Order of the British Empire
2013 deaths